Ute Lubosch (born 10 March 1953 in Erfurt) is a German actress, who began her career in East German theater, film, and television.

Background
Ute Lubosch studied acting at the Theaterhochschule Leipzig and in the drama studio of the Dresden State Theatre in Dresden. While in Dresden, she had her first commitment for longer engagements at the State Theatre Nordhausen and the Rostock People's Theatre. Since the early 1970s she starred in many DEFA films. Her first starring role was in 1979, as Louise Wilhelmine "Minna" Jägle, the fiancée of playwright Georg Buchner (as played by Hilmar Eichhorn) in Lothar Warneke s Addio, piccola mia. Other leading roles followed, including her role as Fräulein Broder in the 1980 film  (Backyard Bliss), based upon the Günter de Bruyn novel Buridans Esel.

Career
From 1990, she worked primarily in theater, then was directed by Roland Oehme in the Störtebeker Festival in Ralswiek, through 2005 in Gents in Berlin with Gesine Danckwart's Should be: breaking point. In addition, she has held teaching positions at the Konrad Wolf Academy of Film and Television in Babelsberg, the Mittweida (FH) and the Ernst Busch Academy of Dramatic Arts in Berlin. Since 2006 Ute Lubosch has been making repeated appearances in the Müritz Saga.

Ute Lubosch has been married since 2008. Her son Marc Lubosch played as a teenager and starred in a number of DEFA films, including the 1989 , in which she played his character's mother.

Filmography

Television
 Deines Nächsten Weib (1980)
 Aus der Franzosenzeit (1981) as Friederike Voß
 Adel im Untergang (1981) as Mia von Fuchs-Nordhoff
 Der ungebetene Gast(2 episodes, 1981) as Vreni
 Stimmung unterm Dach (1982) as Kerstin Gärtner
 Das Mädchen und der Junge (1982)
 Märkische Chronik (10 episodes, 1983)
 Ich, der Vater (1983)
 Bühne frei (1983)
 Schauspielereien]' (1 episode, 1984)
 Paulines zweites Leben (1984)
 Franziska]' (1985)
 Irrläufer (1985)
 Händel aus Halle (1985)
 Das Doppelleben des Monsieur Tourillon (1985) as Irma
 Zwei Nikoläuse unterwegs (1985) as Barbara Bach
 Das wirkliche Blau (1986) as Conception
 Weihnachtsgeschichten (1986) as Rose Freitag
 Alfons Zitterbacke (6 episodes, 1986) as Mutter Zitterbacke, Director Andreas Schreiber
 Johanna (7 episodes, 1989) as Johanna
 Garantiert ungestört (1990) as Cippolina
 Der Staatsanwalt hat das Wort (2 episodes, 1978–1991) as Renate, Stubenfrau
 Hüpf, Häschen, hüpf (1991)
 Feuerwache 09 (2 episodes, 1991)
 Der Landarzt (1 episode, 1993) as Frau Heller
 Der Mann auf der Bettkante (1995) as Jenna Wissbach
 Polizeiruf 110 (6 episodes, 1980–1995)
 Der König (1 episode, 1996) as Tina Wohlbrück
 Liebe Lügen (1997)
 Sardsch (1 episode, 1997)
 Abgehauen (1998) as Christa W., Director Frank Beyer
 Die Cleveren (1 episode, 2000) as Maria Blücher
 Balko (1 episode, 2001) as Roswitha Herrmann
 Wolff's Turf (2 episodes, 1995–2003) as Frau Groll, Greta Baumer
 Leipzig Homicide (1 episode, 2006) as Prosecutor Schiffner
 Tatort (3 episodes, 2000–2008) as Asha, Dr. Hildebrandt

Film
 Der Dritte (1972) as Diakonissin. Director: Egon Günther
 Der nackte Mann auf dem Sportplatz (1974) as Regine. Director Konrad Wolf
 Bankett für Achilles (1975) as Beate. Director Roland Gräf
 Ein Sonntagskind, das manchmal spinnt (1978) as Franziska Peters. Director: Hans Kratzert
 Zwei Betten in der hohen Tatra (1978)
 Addio, piccola mia (1979) as Louise. Director: Lothar Warneke
 Wie wär's mit uns beiden? (1980) as Helena. Director: Helge Trimpert
  (1980) as Fräulein Broder, aka Backhouse Bliss, Director Herrmann Zschoche
 Don Juan, Karl-Liebknecht-Straße 78 (1980) as Regieassistentin. Director: Siegfried Kühn
 Aleksandr malenkiy (1981) as Tessa, Director Vladimir Fokin
 Das Luftschiff (1983) as Teresa. Director: Rainer Simon
 Das Eismeer ruft (1984) as Mutter, Director Jörg Foth
 Einer trage des anderen Last (1988) as Sittichs Freundin. Director Lothar Warneke
 Felix und der Wolf (1988) as Sinas Mutter, Director Evelyn Schmidt
 Die Schauspielerin (1988) as Rosa, Director: Siegfried Kühn
  (1989) as Roberts Mutter. Director Herrmann Zschoche
 Die Beteiligten (1989) as Hilde Redlin. Director Horst E. Brandt
 Die Architekten (1990) as Franziska Scharf. Directed by Peter Kahane
 Miraculi (1992), Director: Ulrich Weiss
 Lola rennt (1998) as Mutter, Directed by Tom Tykwer
 Nichts als die Wahrheit (1999) as Gerichtsmedizinerin, Director Roland Suso Richter
 Neon Aura (2010) as Manja
 Nacht ohne Morgen (2011) as Marianne Weber

References

External links
 

Living people
1953 births
Theaterhochschule Leipzig alumni
Actors from Erfurt
German film actresses
German television actresses